The Guduscani or Goduscani were a tribe whose location and origin on the territory of early medieval Croatia remains a matter of dispute. According to one hypothesis they were located around present-day Gacka (Lika), between upper Kupa river and the Dalmatian coast, or that were inhabitants around the river Guduča near the Bribir region.

Etymology
They are mentioned three times in the Frankish Annals (Guduscani, Guduscanorum, Guduscanis) and twice in Vita Hludovici (Goduscanorum). Petar Skok and Radoslav Katičić derived their ethnonym from Proto-Slavic *gъd-, similar to Proto-Prussian gude in the meaning of "forest". Skok, and Petar Šimunović, also derived it from Proto-Slavic *gadъ (<gu-odh-/*guedh-), "snake", or *gatъ, "gap, depth, dam". Constantine VII (905–959) mentioned in his work De Administrando Imperio a županija in Croatia in the 10th century called "Gūtzēkă", which is translated as Gacka. Some tried to connect Gacka as an ethnonym of the Guduscans, but it is not certain that Gacka got its name from the tribe. The hypothetical derivation from the toponym of Roman city of Guduscum (Kučevo in Serbia) is rejected by now because such a toponym never existed. The theory relating their name to the name of Goths is problematic because the suffix indicates that the ethnonym originates from name of a place and not people.

History
In the Frankish Annals, the Guduscani are mentioned as allies to the Carolingians, and the Duke Borna is mentioned as "dux Dalmaciae", "dux Dalmatiae et Liburniae" and "dux Guduscanorum". However, there exist different semantic readings of the source, some saying that Borna was the duke of Guduscani, of Guduscani and Timočani or a separate duke from both of them.

Borna seemingly was the first titled duke, i.e. prince (dux) of Guduscani, which indicates that the Guduscans initially could have been the temporary basis of Borna's authority and could have occupied a much larger territory from Bribir (river Guduča, a confluence of Krka river) in Dalmatia to Gacka in Lika, south of Lower Pannonia. The old consideration that the Guduscani originated from the territory of Moesia (present-day Serbia) and that together with the Timočani became allies of the Franks is disputable due to lack of evidence and arguments.

In 818 they were part of an envoy of Borna sent with the other South Slavic tribes (nationes) of Timočani and Praedenecenti (possibly an off-shot of Abodrites) to the court of Louis the Pious in Herstal. Some scholars also related them to the Khashānīn (possibly Kashubians) mentioned by Al-Masudi. In 819 alongside Borna fought against Ljudevit, the Duke of the Slavs in Lower Pannonia. They were part of the army of Borna against Ljudevit at the Battle of Kupa (819) but deserted before the battle. Borna conquered their lands again upon returning from the battle.

Identity
Seemingly only after the fall of Guduscani, and during the time of Mislav or Trpimir, was imposed a dynasty with undisputed Croatian identity which legitimized and spread it further. Depending on the interpretation of the Byzantine and Frankish sources, some historians consider them to be a tribe separate from the Croats and that the emergence of the Croatian political identity and power is not related to the region of Lika yet of Northern Dalmatia. Some argue that Borna possibly was their gentile chieftain and they represented only one small tribe among others in medieval Croatia. However, Borna most probably was not a member of the Guduscani because they later deserted him and got reconquered. The events and their behavior indicates that Guduscani were a separate identity and group from the Croats in Dalmatia, possibly related to the account of Avars living in Croatia from De Administrando Imperio and that were more similar or shared more history with Pannonian Slavs than Croats. The view that the Guduscani were Gothic remnants is not widely accepted, as the state of the Goths was in Italy and it ceased to exist in the mid-6th century, while their presence in the former Roman province of Dalmatia and Liburnia was not dominant, however, there were Valagoths as well in the region.

References

Sources

Medieval Croatia
South Slavic tribes
9th century in Croatia
10th century in Croatia
History of Lika